Lee Berrian Powell (May 15, 1908 – July 30, 1944) was an American film actor known for leading or other major roles in several serials and B-westerns. He was the first actor to portray The Lone Ranger on film. During World War II, he enlisted in the U.S. Marine Corps and participated in combat on several Pacific Islands, on one of which he died.

Film career
Powell attended the University of Montana with dramatics, football and track as his main interests. After various stock work he tried his luck in Hollywood.

Making his first appearance uncredited in Under Two Flags (1936), Powell gained fame for playing the suspect who turned out to be The Lone Ranger and one of The Fighting Devil Dogs in 1938 serials. He was the first actor to portray the Lone Ranger on film. In addition to making films for Republic Pictures, Powell also appeared in Universal Pictures Flash Gordon Conquers the Universe serial, made one Western for the soon-to-be-defunct Grand National Pictures and made the six Western programmer films of the Frontier Marshals series, in which each of the three leads (the others being Bill "Cowboy Rambler" Boyd and Art Davis) played a lawman bearing his own name, for Producers Releasing Corporation. Between films, Powell also appeared in Barnett Brothers circus being billed as "The Lone Ranger" until litigation had him change his billing. Powell married Norma Rogers, a circus bareback rider and the daughter of the circus owner.

Marine Corps career
Powell enlisted in the United States Marine Corps on August 17, 1942, serving in the 2nd Pioneer Battalion, 18th Marine Regiment of the 2nd Marine Division.  Achieving the rank of sergeant, Powell actively fought in the Battle of Tarawa and Battle of Saipan.

Although he was widely reported to have been killed in action, those who knew Powell personally knew that he died of poisoning on Tinian, while celebrating the combat victory there, as the result of drinking an improvised concoction containing wood alcohol, which is toxic if ingested and temporarily blinded at least one other marine. Another source, Fred Goerner, a CBS correspondent, while conducting research for his later best seller The Search for Amelia Earhart (1966), had a discussion with a former marine who participated in the Battles of Saipan and Battle of Tinian in June and July 1944. That marine told Goerner that Powell died after drinking poisoned sake. The monthly muster roll of his unit, the 2nd Battalion of the 18th Marines, notes that on July 30, 1944, Powell "died as a result of wood alcohol poisoning, not in line of duty, not result of own misconduct". The reason for the conflicting reports of Powell's death is that it was "officially" reported in newspapers that he had been killed in action so that children who were his fans would believe the "Lone Ranger" died heroically and not from drinking alcohol. 

Initially buried on Tinian, Powell's remains were transferred to the National Memorial Cemetery of the Pacific in Honolulu.

Filmography

References

External links

1908 births
1944 deaths
American male film actors
United States Marine Corps personnel killed in World War II
Male film serial actors
Male Western (genre) film actors
United States Marine Corps non-commissioned officers
Male actors from Long Beach, California
20th-century American male actors
Deaths by poisoning
Burials in the National Memorial Cemetery of the Pacific